Malmgren is an ornamental Swedish surname composed of the elements malm ‘ore’ + gren ‘branch’

People
 Anders Johan Malmgren (1834–1897), Finnish zoologist and botanist
 Arthur Leopold Malmgren (1860-1947), Russian Lutheran bishop, doctor of theology
 Axel Malmgren (1857-1901), Swedish artist
 Björn A. Malmgren, Marine geologist associated with the Punctuated gradualism hypothesis
 Dick Malmgren (? - 1992), Artist and writer for Archie Comics
 Dallin Malmgren (born 1949), Young adult fiction author
 Ernfrid Malmgren (1899 - 1970), Swedish professor and president of the Universal Esperanto Association (UEA).
 Eugen Malmgren (1876 - 1941), Swedish born musician, cellist in St. Petersburg, Russia 
 Finn Malmgren (1895–1928), Swedish meteorologist and Arctic explorer
 Harald Malmgren, Trade negotiator who served in the administrations of John F. Kennedy, Lyndon B. Johnson, Richard Nixon, and Gerald Ford
 Jarl Malmgren, (1908–1942), Finnish footballer
 Jens-Ole "Ole" Malmgren (born 1946), Danish composer
 Johan Malmgren, Keyboardist in Swedish bands Elegant Machinery, and S.P.O.C.K
 Judy Malmgren, Australian Television producer and writer
 Karl G. Malmgren (1862–1921), Swedish-born Spokane-based architect
 Knut Malmgren, Swedish National Badminton Championships player during 1940s and 1950s
 Michael Malmgren, Bass player and member of Swedish jazz band Bo Kaspers Orkester
 Peter Malmgren (born 1971), Swedish golfer
 Philippa "Pippa" Malmgren (born 1962), International politics and policy expert
 Russell Malmgren (1905–1982), American sound engineer
 Ture Malmgren (1851–1922), Swedish journalist, book publisher, and municipal politician. Creator of Tureborg Castle
 Ulrika Malmgren (born 1960), is a Swedish actress and radio presenter
 Yat Malmgren (1916–2002), Swedish dancer and acting teacher

Places
 Finn Malmgren Fjord, a fjord in Orvin Land at Nordaustlandet, Svalbard. Named for Finn Malmgren
 Jack Malmgren Memorial Skate Park, located within Posse Grounds Park in Sedona, AZ
 Malmgren Bay, located on Renaud Island in the Biscoe Islands of Antarctica. Named for Finn Malmgren
 Malmgren, Saskatchewan, Canada
 Tomb of Ture Malmgren, unused grave of Ture Malmgren.

Other uses
 Cutter & Malmgren, Architecture firm that designed multiple buildings listed on the U.S. National Register of Historic Places
 Malmgren Mfg., Former farm implement manufacturing company based in Saint Boniface, Winnipeg
 Malmgren Racing

References

Swedish-language surnames